Makoto Furukawa is a Japanese writer. In January 2020, he won the 162nd Akutagawa Prize for his book Seitaka Awadachisō.

References 

Living people
Year of birth missing (living people)
Place of birth missing (living people)
Japanese male writers
Akutagawa Prize winners